Ten pairs of divers competed in the team event at the 2015 European Diving Championships. The team from Russia won the gold medal.

Medalists

Results

2015 European Diving Championships